Mustafa Tiryaki (born 2 March 1987) is an English footballer who plays as a forward for Bedfont Sports.

Career
Tiryaki joined Maidenhead United in 2008 after playing semi-professional football in Turkey. He initially failed to find form and was sent out to Potters Bar Town on loan, scoring two goals in four games. On his return to Maidenhead, he hit a great vein of form. His goalscoring resulted in him being named the club's Player of the Season and resulted in a trial at Cheltenham Town in the summer of 2009. Tiryaki joined Havant & Waterlooville in July 2009, signing a two-year deal with the Conference South club, despite attracting interest from several Conference National sides. He remained at Havant & Waterlooville until June 2011, leaving the club having failed to agree a new deal. During his time at Havant & Waterlooville, Tiryaki scored 23 league goals in 75 appearances.

He spent time on trial at Scunthorpe United in July 2011, scoring in a friendly victory against Bottesford Town, but was ultimately not offered a deal. He then went on trial at Tranmere Rovers twice in the summer of 2011, signing a one-year deal in early August. He made his competitive Football League debut on the first day of the 2011–12 season, starting in Tranmere's 1–0 victory against Chesterfield on 6 August. He scored his first professional goal for Tranmere in a 2–1 home win over Walsall on 22 October 2011. Seven days later after scoring his first goal on 29 October 2011, Tiryaki scored a brace in a 4–2 defeat against Scunthorpe United. In the January transfer window, Tiryaki was linked with Turkish giant Trabzonspor for a reported £100,000 bid. However, the move was never materialise.

On 1 March 2012, Tiryaki was allowed to join Conference National side Cambridge United for a one-month emergency loan. He left the Abbey Stadium at the end of March 2012.

He returned to Tranmere, playing some games towards the end of the season, but was released in May.

After being released by Tranmere, he moved to Turkey by signing a four-year contract for Turkish TFF First League team 1461 Trabzon in June 2012.

In September 2015, Tiryaki moved to National League side Boreham Wood. After this Tiryaki had a short spell in Turkey with Manisa Büyükşehir Belediyespor F.C.

In March 2017, Tiryaki moved to Wealdstone. However, due to issues with international clearance from his former team, he was restricted to only friendly appearances. In late October 2017, international clearance was granted for Tiryaki, allowing him to sign a contract and play in all games for Wealdstone. On 14 November, he joined Kings Langley on dual registration. On 27 March 2018, Tiryaki left Wealdstone and then moved to Bedfont Sports. He left in April 2019 to become a player assistant coach at Brimsdown but returned to Bedfont again on 25 December 2019.

Personal life
Tiryaki is of Turkish parentage.

Career statistics

References

External links

Living people
1987 births
Footballers from the London Borough of Hackney
English footballers
English people of Turkish descent
English Football League players
National League (English football) players
TFF First League players
Tranmere Rovers F.C. players
Maidenhead United F.C. players
Godalming Town F.C. players
Havant & Waterlooville F.C. players
Potters Bar Town F.C. players
Cambridge United F.C. players
1461 Trabzon footballers
Wealdstone F.C. players
Göztepe S.K. footballers
Boreham Wood F.C. players
Kings Langley F.C. players
Bedfont Sports F.C. players
Brimsdown F.C. players
Association football forwards